Medicus is Latin for physician, and may more specifically refer to:

People 
 Dieter Medicus (1929–2015), German jurist
 Dieter Medicus (ice hockey) (born 1957), German ice hockey player
 Friedrich Kasimir Medikus (1738–1808), German physician and botanist
 Fritz Medicus (1876–1956), German-Swiss philosopher
 Henry Medicus (1865–1941), part-owner of Brooklyn Dodgers from 1905 to 1912
 Medicus Long (died 1885), American lawyer and politician

Other uses 
 Medicus (journal), a journal edited by students of the Yerevan State Medical University
 The Physician a.k.a. Medicus, a novel by Noah Gordon
 Ruso and the Disappearing Dancing Girls, published in the United States as Medicus, a novel by Ruth Downie
 Medicus, several physicians in the television series Spartacus: Blood and Sand and its sequels

See also
 
 
 Index Medicus, comprehensive index of medical scientific journal articles, published since 1879
 Medicus Mundi International, the Network of private not-for-profit organisations working in the field of international health cooperation and advocacy
 Medic (disambiguation)